Lee Joo-young (이주영) may refer to:
 Lee Joo-young (actress, born 1987), South Korean actress
 Lee Joo-young (actress, born 1992), South Korean actress
 Lee Joo-young (born 1991), South Korean football/soccer player